Ioana Raluca Olaru and Olga Savchuk were the defending champions, both of them were present this year, but played with different partners.
Olaru partnered with Galina Voskoboeva, but they lost in the first round against Arina Rodionova and Olga Savchuk.
Savchuk partnered with Arina Rodionova, but they lost in the semifinals against Vitalia Diatchenko and Ekaterina Dzehalevich.

Seeds

  İpek Şenoğlu /  Yaroslava Shvedova (quarterfinals)
  Akgul Amanmuradova /  Darya Kustova (quarterfinals)
  Ioana Raluca Olaru /  Galina Voskoboeva (first round)
  Maria Kondratieva /  Sophie Lefèvre (first round)

Draw

External links
Main Draw

Doubles